Brownstown United F.C. is a football club from Georgetown in St Vincent and the Grenadines.
The club currently play in the NLA First Division Club Championship.

History
The Brownstown United Football Club was founded in 1993. Because of the lack of youth players being able to form the integral part of the team and a lack of finance, the team was forced to rebuild and re-establish in 2006. The re-establishment of the team is the brain work of Bradley Ollivierre, Rolando Lewis, Kelvin Scott and Deryl Herbert. In 2006 the team entered the local tournament, with the players from the youth team now forming the basis of the squad. The team made it to the championship game, coming back from two goals down to win it 3–2 against the unique warriors. In the 2007–2008 season the club made it to the final again, but this time failed to come back from three goals down and lost 2–3 to the Carib Pearl Warriors. The club qualified for the national club championship as a result of finishing runners-up; however, qualification didn't go so well, with the team losing 3–1 against Richland Park Pride and Joy, 6–1 to Campdonia Chelsea and 2–1 to Avenues United FC and was placed in the first division as a result. In its first season of the national league, the club finish sixth place. In 2007 the youth team was also re-established, with some of them playing a vital role in the first team.

Current squad

Achievements

NCB North East Football League: 1
2006/2007

SVGFF CUP: Runners up
2010

External links
St. Vincent and the Grenadines Football Federation

References

Football clubs in Saint Vincent and the Grenadines